Que Me Entierren Con la Banda (Eng.: "Bury Me With The Band")  is the third major label studio album by Regional Mexican singer Jenni Rivera, released on March 27, 2000.

Track listing

References

2000 albums
Fonovisa Records albums
Jenni Rivera albums